The garden emerald (Chlorostilbon assimilis) is a small hummingbird in the "emeralds", tribe Trochilini of subfamily Trochilinae. It is found in Costa Rica and  Panama.

Taxonomy and systematics

The garden emerald was at one time considered a subspecies of the blue-tailed emerald (Chlorostilbon mellisugus). As its own species, it is monotypic.

Description

The adult male has dark metallic green upperparts with bluish green uppertail coverts. Its forked tail is blue-black and the central feathers have a light bluish green gloss. Its underparts are a brighter metallic green than the upperparts, sometimes with a light blue sheen, and it has white thigh tufts. The adult female has bright metallic green to bronze green upperparts with bluish green uppertail coverts. Its tail is blue-black, with dull metallic green central feathers and pale gray tips on the outer ones. It has dusky cheeks, a white or grayish white spot behind the eye, and pale gray underparts. Juvenile males are like the adult female but darker gray below.

Distribution and habitat

The garden emerald is found in southwestern Costa Rica, the Pacific coast of Panama, and the offshore Coiba and Pearl islands. It inhabits open landscapes like the edges of woodlands, hedgerows, streamside thickets, scrublands, and gardens.

Behavior

Movement

The garden emerald is generally sedentary. However, there are reports of its moving back and forth between mainland Panama, the Pearl Islands, and other small islands.

Feeding

The garden emerald forages for nectar by trap-lining, visiting a circuit of flowering trees, shrubs, and other plants. It also feeds on small insects that it gleans from vegetation.

Breeding

The garden emerald's breeding season has not been fully determined but in Panama appears to span at least from November to March. Its nest, incubation length, time to fledging, and other details of its breeding phenology have not been documented. They are assumed to be similar to those of other Chlorostilbon hummingbirds.

Vocalization

The garden emerald's vocalizations are not well known but appear to be similar to those of Canivet's emerald (Cynanthus canivetii). That species' song is believed to be "an endlessly repeated, characterless wiry tseee tseeree" and its call has been described as "a dry, scratchy chut or chit, sometimes run together into a soft, staccato chatter".

Status

The IUCN has assessed the garden emerald as being of Least Concern. It has a large range and its estimated population of at least 50,000 mature individuals is believed to be stable. No immediate threats have been identified. It "[r]eadily accepts man-made habitat" and may even have expanded its range as forest has been cleared.

References

Further reading
  Stiles and Skutch, A Guide to the Birds of Costa Rica 

garden emerald
Birds of Costa Rica
Birds of Panama
garden emerald
garden emerald